George Whitfield Angus (15 April 1875 – 16 November 1917) was an Australian rules footballer who played for and coached the Collingwood Football Club in the Victorian Football League (VFL).

Angus was a late comer to the game, making his Collingwood debut at the age of 27 in 1902 having previously fought in the Boer War.  He was a member of back to back premiership teams in 1902 and 1903. In 1910 he was appointed captain-coach of Collingwood and made an immediate impression, leading the club to a grand final victory over Carlton that year.

Angus was appointed captain-coach of Williamstown in the VFA in 1912 and played 14 games and kicked 11 goals, before stepping down as captain as a result of illness following an 84-point loss at Brighton in round 15. He was replaced as captain by another former Collingwood player in Bert Reitman, but continued to coach the team for the rest of the season.

References

External links

1875 births
Collingwood Football Club coaches
Collingwood Football Club Premiership coaches
Collingwood Football Club players
Collingwood Football Club Premiership players
Williamstown Football Club players
Williamstown Football Club coaches
Australian rules footballers from Victoria (Australia)
1917 deaths
Three-time VFL/AFL Premiership players
One-time VFL/AFL Premiership coaches